The 16th Michigan Infantry Regiment was an infantry regiment that served in the Union Army during the American Civil War.

Service
The 16th Michigan Infantry was organized as T.B.W. Stockton's Independent Regiment at Plymouth and Detroit, Michigan between July and September, 1861. Among the soldiers in the 16th was future Michigan state politician Henry H. Aplin. It was mustered into U.S. service as the 16th Regiment, Michigan Volunteer Infantry on Sept. 8, 1861 with an enrollment of 761 officers and men. The Regiment left Detroit for Washington, D.C., on Sept. 16, 1861 to join Butterfield's Brigade, Fitz John Porter's Division, Army of the Potomac. It went into camp at Hall's Hill, Arlington, Virginia, Defences of Washington, D.C., for the winter of 1861–62.

Gettysburg
At the Battle of Gettysburg on the second day they defended Little Round Top against a determined Confederate attack aimed at flanking the Union Army. They were one of four regiments, of the 3rd brigade, of the 1st Division of the V Corps of the Union Army of the Potomac. The 3rd brigade was commanded by Col. Strong Vincent. It consisted of the 16th Michigan, the 44th New York, the 83rd Pennsylvania, and the 20th Maine, placed in that order right to left, with the 16th at the right end closest to the rest of the Union Army, and the 20th Maine at the left end, the actual end of the entire Union Army at Gettysburg.

The 3rd brigade arrived at Little Round Top only minutes before the Confederate attack. The 16th Michigan bore repeated attacks from the 4th and 5th Texas. The 16th was the smallest regiment in the brigade, with only 263 men. Several times Vincent successfully rallied the 16th Michigan to repel the Texas charge. Vincent was mortally wounded during one Texas charge and died on July 7, after receiving a deathbed promotion to brigadier general.

Before the Michiganders could be overrun, reinforcements arrived in the form of the 140th New York and a battery of four guns—Battery D, 5th U.S. Artillery. The 140th New York took position immediately to the right of the 16th Michigan.

The 16th Michigan remained in position on Little Round Top for the rest of the Battle of Gettysburg.

End of Service
The regiment was mustered out of service on July 8, 1865.

Total strength and casualties
The regiment suffered 12 officers and 235 enlisted men who were killed in action or mortally wounded and 143 enlisted men who died of disease, for a total of 390
fatalities.

Original field staff
Colonel Thomas B. Stockton of Flint, Michigan, age not available
Lt. Colonel John V. Reuhle of Detroit, Michigan, age not available
Major Norval E. Welch of Ann Arbor, Michigan, 26
Surgeon Isaac Wixam of Argentine, Michigan, 58
Asst. Surgeon William H. Butler of Buffalo, New York, 36
Adjutant Thomas E. Morris of East Saginaw, Michigan, 26
Quartermaster Miner S. Newell of Flushing, Michigan, 32
Chaplain William H. Brockway of Plymouth, Michigan, 48

See also
List of Michigan Civil War Units
Michigan in the American Civil War

Notes

References
The Civil War Archive

Units and formations of the Union Army from Michigan
1865 disestablishments in Michigan
1861 establishments in Michigan
Military units and formations established in 1861
Military units and formations disestablished in 1865